Alessandro Faggioli (born 2 February 2000) is an Italian footballer who plays as a forward for  club Virtus Entella.

Club career
He made his Serie C debut for Teramo on 27 August 2017 in a game against Mestre.

On 8 July 2021, he signed with Ancona-Matelica.

On 21 July 2022, Faggioli moved to Virtus Entella.

References

External links
 

2000 births
Living people
Sportspeople from the Province of Pescara
Footballers from Abruzzo
Italian footballers
Association football forwards
Serie C players
Serie D players
Delfino Pescara 1936 players
S.S. Teramo Calcio players
S.S.D. Audace Cerignola players
Ancona-Matelica players
Virtus Entella players